Horacio Zeballos was the defending champion but chose not to defend his title.

Nicolás Jarry won the title after defeating Gerald Melzer 6–3, 6–2 in the final.

Seeds

Draw

Finals

Top half

Bottom half

References
Main Draw
Qualifying Draw

Quito Challenger - Singles
2017 Singles